Robert Lucas was one of the two MPs for Ipswich in 1406.

References

Members of the Parliament of England (pre-1707) for Ipswich